Jonathan Harris (born August 27, 1979 in Shelburne, Vermont) is an Internet artist and designer living in Brooklyn, New York.

Overview 
He has won three Webby Awards.  Harris was honored as "Young Global Leader" by the World Economic Forum. His work has received coverage by CNN and BBC and has been exhibited in the Museum of Modern Art in New York and the Centre Pompidou in Paris. In his own words, his work aims to "explore and explain the human world". He studied computer science at Princeton University. Some of his noted works are the Yahoo Time Capsule, which attempted to create a digital finger print of the world in 2006, I Want You To Want Me (2007), the Sputnik Observatory, Universe, the Whale Hunt, and anonymous question/answer service Justcurio.us.

In May 2007, Harris spent nine days living with a family of Inupiat people in Barrow, Alaska – there, he documented the ancient tradition of the whale hunt in a series of 3,214 photographs and later assembled them into an interactive database narrative and website. The work, entitled "The Whale Hunt," combines "visual media, technology, and storytelling" in order to translate "an epic personal experience from the physical world" into an easily accessible artwork using the internet as a platform where unlimited people can view it.

Public collections

 Museum of Modern Art, New York. I Want You To Want Me 
 The Museum of Fine Arts, Houston, Houston, Texas
 Australian Centre for the Moving Image, Melbourne, Victoria, Australia

Awards 

1999
 Vermont State Quarter Design. Finalist (from over 800 contestants)

2002
 American Associated Collegiate Press . Leader of the American Student Press (for Troubadour Magazine)

2003
 AIGA Design Awards . Winner, Information Design (WordCount)

2004
 Fabrica . Treviso, Italy . Residency
 Yahoo! . Pick of the Day (10x10)

2005
 Fabrica . Treviso, Italy . Fellowship
 Webby Awards . Winner (People's Voice, Arts)
 Webby Awards . Winner (Structure and Navigation)
 Prix Ars Electronica . Honorable Mention (Net Vision)
 ID Annual Design Review . Honorable Mention, Interactive Art (10x10)
 Flash Forward . Winner, Technical Merit (10x10)
 How Magazine Interactive Design Awards . Merit (10x10)
 PC Magazine . Top 100 Websites of 2005 (WordCount)
 Favorite Website Award . Pick of the Day (10x10)
 Yahoo! . Pick of the Day (Understanding Vorn)
 Yahoo! . Pick of the Day (Phylotaxis)

2006
 Webby Awards. Nominee (Structure and Navigation)
 Webby Awards . Nominee (Net Art)
 Pixel Awards . Winner (Weird)
 Pixel Awards . Runner-up (Best in show)
 Yahoo! . Pick of the Day (We Feel Fine)
 Yahoo! . Pick of the Day (Lovelines)

2007
 Webby Awards. Nominee (Net Art)
 Webby Awards. Nominee (Visual Design / Aesthetic)
 Webby Awards. Nominee (Structure / Navigation)

2008
 Webby Awards. Winner (Personal site)
 Webby Awards. Nominee (Visual design / Aesthetic)
 Tokyo Type Directors Club . Winner (Interactive Design Prize)
 Print Magazine . New Visual Artists
 Creativity Magazine . Creativity Top 50
 ID Magazine Annual Design Review . Honorable Mention (Interactive )

2009
 World Economic Forum . Young Global Leader
 Santa Fe Art Institute . Santa Fe, New Mexico. Fellowship
 Caldera . Sisters, Oregon . Fellowship

References

External links 

 Work of Jonathan Harris
 The Whale Hunt Project
 Justcurio.us
 
  (TED2007)
  (TED2007)

1979 births
Living people
American artists